This is a list of international cricket grounds in India that have hosted at least one international cricket match (Test, ODI or T20I). India has 53 international cricket venues, the most in any country - 30 more than the next most: England with 23.

International cricket was held in India for the first time in December 1933 when the Gymkhana Ground in Bombay played host to the India-England Test match. The first ODI match in India was held at the Sardar Vallabhbhai Patel Stadium, Ahmedabad in 1981. The first T20I match in India was held at the Brabourne Stadium in Mumbai in 2007.

List
Last updated at the conclusion of Australia Tour of India 2023.

Active stadiums

Former stadiums

Key

Location of active stadiums

See also
List of cricket grounds in India
List of stadiums in India

References

External links
Cricket Grounds - ESPN Cricinfo

India
International
Indian cricket lists